The 1999 AAPT Championships was a men's ATP tennis tournament held in Adelaide, Australia and played on outdoor hardcourts. It was the 22nd edition of the tournament and was held from 4 to 11 January. Second-seeded Thomas Enqvist won his first title of the year and the 15th of his career.

Finals

Singles

 Thomas Enqvist defeated  Lleyton Hewitt 4–6, 6–1, 6–2
 It was Enqvist's 1st singles title of the year and the 14th of his career.

Doubles

 Gustavo Kuerten /  Nicolás Lapentti defeated  Jim Courier /  Patrick Galbraith 6–4, 6–4

External links
 ITF tournament edition details

Aapt Championships, 1999
Next Generation Adelaide International
1990s in Adelaide
January 1999 sports events in Australia